Berdahl is a surname. Notable people with the surname include:

Blaze Berdahl (born 1980), American actress, singer, rapper, voice-over actor, announcer and narrator
Daphne Berdahl (1964–2007), German-born American anthropologist
Jennifer Berdahl, American sociologist
Robert M. Berdahl (born 1937), American college and university administrator